The 1989 Canoe Slalom World Cup was a series of races in 4 canoeing and kayaking categories organized by the International Canoe Federation (ICF). It was the 2nd edition.

Calendar

Final standings

Results

World Cup Race in Mezzana 

The World Cup Race in Mezzana, Italy was one of the races of this world cup series and it took place on August 12.

World Cup Race in Augsburg 

The World Cup Race in Augsburg, West Germany took place on August 15.

World Cup Final 

The World Cup Final took place in Tacen, Yugoslavia on August 20.

References

External links 
 International Canoe Federation

Canoe Slalom World Cup
1989 in canoeing